Dragnet is an American television series starring Jack Webb and Harry Morgan which ran for four seasons, from January 12, 1967, to April 16, 1970. To differentiate it from the earlier 1950s Dragnet television series, the year in which each season ended was made part of the on-screen title—the series started as Dragnet 1967 and ended as Dragnet 1970. The entire series aired Thursdays at 9:30–10:00 pm (EST) and was directed by Jack Webb.

All four seasons of this series have been released on DVD; Season 1 ("Dragnet 1967") by Universal Studios Home Entertainment, and seasons 2 ("1968"), 3 ("1969") and 4 ("1970") by Shout! Factory.

This was the second television series in a Dragnet media franchise encompassing film, television, books and comics. It has the distinction of being one of the first examples of a discontinued American TV series being revived years later with some original cast members.

Cast
Jack Webb as Sgt. Joe Friday
Harry Morgan as Officer Bill Gannon
Other cast members included Don Ross, Olan Soule, Marco Lopez, Herb Vigran, Clark Howat, Art Balinger, Alfred Shelly, Art Gilmore, Ralph Moody, Virginia Gregg, Ed Deemer, Howard Culver, Bert Holland, Don Stewart, Bobby Troup, Emily Banks, Len Wayland, William Boyett, Stacy Harris, Stuart Nisbet, Kent McCord, Robert Brubaker, Harry Bartell, Jill Banner, Robert Patten, Sidney Clute, Anthony Eisley, Virginia Vincent, Don Dubbins, James McEachin, Peggy Webber, and Vic Perrin playing different roles.

Series overview
Typically, each episode begins with stock footage of Los Angeles over Sgt. Joe Friday's introduction, "This is the city." Friday then specifies the day and time with a description of the watch, or shift, he and Gannon are working. The two investigate each case that arises with Friday, usually, the lead investigator. Although always polite and professional,  Friday's manner of questioning witnesses, or suspects, is terse, clipped and rigid, resulting in rapid dialogue. If a witness begins providing irrelevant details, Friday often responds, "Just the facts, ma'am (sir)." At the end of each episode, the legal fate of the arrested suspects is revealed.  Friday and Gannon are rarely shown outside their professional relationship. Gannon occasionally refers to his wife and family; and, sometimes encourages Friday, who is single, to have more of a social life.

TV movie 
In 1965 Jack Webb was approached by Universal Pictures to produce a Dragnet television movie to air on NBC.  NBC programming director Mort Werner was impressed with the film and decided there was more value in developing Dragnet as a weekly TV series.  Webb was more interested in continuing the franchise with TV movies, but ultimately agreed.  The movie would not be released until January 27, 1969 (midway through the third season of the TV series) on The NBC Monday Movie, with the promotional title World Premiere: Dragnet.

The working title in the film's script was Dragnet 1966, although the official title is simply Dragnet.  The movie is commonly referred to as Dragnet 1966 to distinguish it from other works in the franchise. This movie is included as an extra in the Dragnet 1968 DVD set.

Episodes

Season 1 (Dragnet 1967)

Season 2 (Dragnet 1968)

Season 3 (Dragnet 1969)

Season 4 (Dragnet 1970)

References

External links
 Badge 714.com, Dragnet fan site (Archive copy)
 Dragnet episode summaries on Badge 714.com (archive copy)

1960s American crime drama television series
1960s American police procedural television series
1967 American television series debuts
1970 American television series endings
1970s American crime drama television series
1970s American police procedural television series
American sequel television series
English-language television shows
Fictional portrayals of the Los Angeles Police Department
NBC original programming
Television series based on radio series
Television shows set in Los Angeles